The following is a list of bands, performers, composers, and conductors, past and present, who have had recordings released on the Nonesuch Records label or any of its subsidiaries or distributed labels, such as World Circuit:



A

 John Adams
 Afro-Cuban All Stars (World Circuit/Nonesuch)
 AfroCubism (World Circuit/Nonesuch)
 Alarm Will Sound
 Edward Aldwell
 Arthur Alexander
 Tony Allen (World Circuit/Nonesuch)
 Amadou and Mariam
 Sam Amidon
 Laurie Anderson
 Maurice André
 Timo Andres
 Louis Andriessen
 Angá
 The Arcs
 Robert Ashley
 Sérgio and Odair Assad
 Dan Auerbach
 Abed Azrie

B

 The Bad Plus
 Angelo Badalamenti
 George Balanchine
 Devendra Banhart
 Thomas Bartlett
 Fontella Bass
 Isabel Bayrakdarian
 Beaver & Krause
 Leonard Bernstein
 Malcolm Bilson
 Iva Bittová
 Björk
 The Black Keys
 Blakroc
 The Blind Boys of Alabama
 Afel Bocoum
 William Bolcom
 Bombino
 Boston Camerata
 Boston Symphony Chamber Players
 Billy Bragg
 Michelle Branch
 Tyondai Braxton
 Jon Brion
 Buena Vista Social Club
 T Bone Burnett
 Ken Burns
 Carter Burwell
 Anner Bylsma
 David Byrne
 Don Byron

C

 John Cage
 Calliope
 Camille
 Carolina Chocolate Drops
 Elliott Carter
 Olivia Chaney
 Rhys Chatham
 Boozoo Chavis
 Guy Clark
 Shawn Colvin
 Paolo Conte
 Contemporary Chamber Ensemble
 Ry Cooder
 Jacob Cooper
 Bruno Coulais
 Christina Courtin
 Teresa Cristina
 Rodney Crowell
 George Crumb
 Czechoslovak Brass Orchestra

D

 Michael Daves
 Nataly Dawn
 Jan DeGaetani
 Georges Delerue
 Jeremy Denk
 Donnacha Dennehy
 Toumani Diabaté (World Circuit/Nonesuch)
 Fatoumata Diawara (World Circuit/Nonesuch)
 Dr. John

E

 Early Music Consort of London
 Hamza El Din
 Richard Ellsasser
 Brian Eno
 Ensemble Alcatraz
 Estrellas de Areito (World Circuit/Nonesuch)
 Donald Erb
 Estrellas de Areito
 Bill Evans

F

 Fatboy Slim
 Charlie Feathers
 Michael Feinstein
 Ibrahim Ferrer (World Circuit/Nonesuch)
 Irving Fine
 Fleet Foxes
 Ben Folds
 Bill Frisell

G

 Manuel Galbán
 Kenny Garrett
 George Gershwin
 Ira Gershwin
 Rhiannon Giddens
 Gilberto Gil
 João Gilberto
 Jimmie Dale Gilmore
 Gipsy Kings
 Philip Glass
 Rubén González (World Circuit/Nonesuch)
 Richard Goode
 Michael Gordon
 Ricky Ian Gordon
 Henryk Górecki
 The Gothic Archies
 Jonny Greenwood
 Adam Guettel
 Mark Guiliana

H

 Idjah Hadidjah
 Jim Hall
 Tigran Hamasyan
 John Harbison
 Emmylou Harris
 Kevin Hays
 Julius Hemphill
 Fred Hersch
 Robin Holcomb
 Mieczysław Horszowski
 Wayne Horvitz
 Hurray for the Riff Raff

I

 Iron & Wine

J

 Wanda Jackson
 Paul Jacobs
 James Farm
 Jonnie Johnson

K

 Gabriel Kahane
 Gilbert Kalish
 Giya Kancheli
 Gaby Kerpel
 Igor Kipnis
 Leon Kirchner
 Glenn Kotche
 Viktor Krauss
 Gidon Kremer
 Kremerata Baltica
 Ramnad Krishnan
 Kronos Quartet

L

 Lianne La Havas
 Lake Street Dive
 k.d. lang
 Ruth Laredo
 Last Forever
 Lorraine Hunt Lieberson
 Cheikh Lô (World Circuit/Nonesuch)
 Orlando "Cachaito" López (World Circuit/Nonesuch)
 Los Zafiros (World Circuit/Nonesuch)
 The Low Anthem
 Sergiu Luca

M

 Yo-Yo Ma
 The Magnetic Fields
 Clint Mansell
 Mariza
 Ingram Marshall
 Jessica Lea Mayfield
 Audra McDonald
 Bobby McFerrin
 Kate and Anna McGarrigle
 Brad Mehldau
 Natalie Merchant 
 Stephin Merritt
 Pat Metheny
 Edgar Meyer
 Manuel "Guajiro" Mirabal (World Circuit/Nonesuch)
 Joni Mitchell
 Ivan Moravec
 Joan Morris
 Jelly Roll Morton
 Nico Muhly
 Le Mystère des Voix Bulgares

N

 Youssou N'Dour
 New Jersey Percussion Ensemble
 New York City Ballet Orchestra
 Randy Newman
 Thomas Newman
 Nickel Creek
 Alex North

O

 Paul O'Dette
 Christopher O'Riley
 Conor Oberst
 Odessa Balalaikas
 Offa Rex (The Decemberists + Olivia Chaney
 Orchestra Baobab (World Circuit/Nonesuch)
 Fernando Otero

P

 Eddie Palmieri
 Andrzej Panufnik
 Carlos Paredes
 Mandy Patinkin
 Nicholas Payton
 Krzysztof Penderecki
 George Perle
 Sam Phillips
 Ástor Piazzolla
 Robert Plant
 Pokrovsky Ensemble
 Omara Portuondo (World Circuit/Nonesuch)
 Punch Brothers
 Court gamelan of Pura Paku Alaman

R

 Nasser Rastegar-Nejad
 Radio Tarifa (World Circuit/Nonesuch)
 Joshua Redman
 Steve Reich
 Joshua Rifkin
 Karl Ristenpart
 William Neil Roberts
 Leonard Rosenman
 Rostam
 Christopher Rouse
 Rustavi Choir
 Frederic Rzewski

S

 Sabri Brothers
 Nadja Salerno-Sonnenberg
 David Sanborn
 Oumou Sangaré (World Circuit/Nonesuch)
 Gustavo Santaolalla
 Scritti Politti
 Compay Segundo (World Circuit/Nonesuch)
 Philip Selway
 SFJAZZ Collective
 Duncan Sheik
 Sierra Maestra (World Circuit/Nonesuch)
 Dmitry Sitkovetsky
 Stephen Sondheim
 St. Germain
 Teresa Stich-Randall
 Teresa Sterne
 Teresa Stratas
 Morton Subotnick
 Sanford Sylvan

T

 Tōru Takemitsu
 The Tango Project
 Taraf de Haïdouks
 Bob Telson
 Chris Thile
 Virgil Thomson
 Ali Farka Touré (World Circuit/Nonesuch)
 Allen Toussaint
 Rokia Traoré
 Michael Tree
 Jeff Tweedy
 Shye Ben Tzur

U

 Dawn Upshaw

V
 Vagabon

 Värttinä
 Laura Veirs
 Caetano Veloso
 Vladimir Viardo
 Cuong Vu

W

 Sara Watkins
 Wilco
 Brian Wilson
Daniel Wohl
 Word of Mouth Chorus
 World Saxophone Quartet
 Charles Wuorinen

X

 Iannis Xenakis

Y

 Akiko Yano
 yMusic

Z

 Los Zafiros (World Circuit/Nonesuch)
 Patrick Zimmerli
 John Zorn

See also 
 Nonesuch Records

References

External links
 Official site list

Nonesuch Records
Nonesuch Records